"Addicted" is a song by Spanish singer Enrique Iglesias. It was the first single released from his seventh studio album, 7. It was a modest hit in the UK, where it charted within the top 20, though it failed to chart on the US Billboard Hot 100. The Spanish version, titled "Adicto", peaked inside the top 10 on the Hot Latin Tracks chart and is included on several formats of the single release.

Music video
The music video was directed by Peter Berg through Mars Media and cinematographed by Tobias Schliessler. It features actress Mischa Barton as Iglesias's love interest. In a radio interview with KIIS-FM Iglesias claimed that the idea for the video was inspired by the movie Midnight Express.  In the video, Iglesias is depicted as a jail prisoner who receives limited visitations with restricted contact from Barton, implying he is addicted to her, and cannot have as much of her as he wants. At the end of the video it is realized that there is no prison, and he simply is addicted to her. Two versions of the music video have been released, one US version and one UK version, using different shots during the fight scene (3:15–3:25).

Track listings

European CD single
 "Addicted" (radio edit)
 "One Night Stand" (Boogieman remix)

UK CD1
 "Addicted" (radio edit)
 "Hero"
 "Adicto" (radio edit)
 "Addicted" (video)

UK CD2
 "Addicted" (radio edit)
 "One Night Stand" (Boogieman remix)
 "Addicted" (The Scumfrog remix)

Australian and Japanese CD single
 "Addicted" (radio edit)
 "One Night Stand" (Boogieman remix)
 "Hero" (live from One and Only)
 "Adicto"

Charts

Release history

References

2003 singles
2003 songs
Enrique Iglesias songs
Interscope Records singles
Music videos directed by Peter Berg
Songs written by Enrique Iglesias
Songs written by Paul Barry (songwriter)